The Elite Ice Hockey League (EIHL), sometimes referred to as the British Elite League or, for sponsorship reasons, the Viaplay Elite League, is an ice hockey league in the United Kingdom. Formed in 2003 following the demise of the Ice Hockey Superleague, it is the highest level of ice hockey competition in the United Kingdom.

The league operate three competitions for members; the play-offs determine the national champion for the season, following a regular season league competition for which separate champions are also crowned, and which selects and seeds the teams in the play-offs. Finally, a stand-alone cup competition, the Challenge Cup, is also held annually including only EIHL teams, beginning with the group stages followed by a knock-out format. In effect, the play-off final, regular end-of-season table and Challenge Cup final crown the British or National Champions, the EIHL League champions and the Cup champions respectively.

The league currently consists of one division of ten teams, with representation from all four nations of the United Kingdom – the only league in any sport to do so. Five of the teams as of 2023 are situated in England, while the other five are spread throughout the Celtic nations; 3 in Scotland, 1 each in Wales and Northern Ireland. In fourteen completed seasons the league championship has been won by five different teams, while the play-offs have crowned six different teams as national champions.

A system of promotion and relegation is not operated by the Elite League; teams enter the league on the basis of a decision by the board of directors. A similar system operates in most American sport, and also in various competitions in Britain and Ireland, including the British Basketball League, the United Rugby Championship, the Netball Superleague and the Hundred and County Championship in English and Welsh cricket.

Despite this, other organised ice-hockey does take place in Great Britain. The level below the Elite League is the National Ice Hockey League, and historically teams have moved between the two leagues for competitive and financial reasons, by agreement of the respective leagues' management.

Internationally, teams from the EIHL can participate in the IIHF's annual Champions Hockey League (CHL), competing for the European Trophy. Participation is based on the strength of the various leagues in Europe (excluding the European/Asian Kontinental Hockey League). Going into the 2022–23 CHL season, the EIHL was ranked the No. 8 league in Europe, allowing them to send their top team to compete in the CHL.

The day-to-day operation of the league is overseen by a Chairman (as of 2023, Tony Smith), a Director of Hockey Operations (Michael Hicks), Media Manager / Hockey Operations (Luke Fisher) and a board of directors. Disciplinary matters are handled by EIHL Hockey Operation's Department of Player Safety (DOPS).

History

Early years, 2003–2010
British ice hockey's structure underwent a major reorganisation in 1996. The British Hockey League (the highest senior competition since 1982, featuring the top two divisions of the sport) was disbanded and replaced by the Ice Hockey Superleague (top tier) and British National League (second tier).

The loss of the Cardiff Devils and the Newcastle Jesters in 2001 reduced the membership of the Superleague to seven; and when the Manchester Storm and the Scottish Eagles folded within a week of one another at the beginning of the 2002–03 season, there were just five remaining teams. In December 2002, the Bracknell Bees announced their intention to resign from the league to join the BNL at the end of the season; and uncertainty surrounded the future of the London Knights and their London Arena home; which ultimately led to the Knights folding in 2003. Owing a large debt to Ice Hockey UK and facing the prospect of having only three members, the league placed itself into liquidation on 30 April 2003.

The three remaining clubs (Belfast Giants, Nottingham Panthers, and Sheffield Steelers) began considering the formation of a new league with a lower wage cap and larger commitment to British players to attract other clubs into joining them. In the weeks that followed they were joined by the Basingstoke Bison, Cardiff Devils, and Coventry Blaze of the British National League and two new organisations, from London and Manchester. A team based in Glasgow was also planned, but did not come to fruition. The new league met considerable opposition from the British National League and the governing body Ice Hockey UK. The IHUK wished for the remaining Superleague clubs to integrate themselves into the BNL and initially refused to grant the new league affiliation. The Superleague clubs were reluctant to join the predominantly British-trained league after several years of playing in an import-dominated league where British players were seldom able to step up to the standard of their North American and European counterparts. The Elite League instead preferred a twelve import limit with the rest of the team being British-trained players. 

The refusal to grant affiliation caused a bitter row that showed little sign of being resolved. Despite not having the support of the governing body, the new league continued their plans. No affiliation would have meant that the clubs would have problems attaining work permits for their signings and finding officials to referee their matches. The row also threatened the future of the Nottingham Panthers, as the National Ice Centre were reluctant to allow a team from an unaffiliated league to hire their arena. The issue was resolved in August 2003 when the Panthers and the NIC announced an icetime agreement. The EIHL finally gained affiliation in August 2003, with only weeks to go before the beginning of the new season.

The new league began on 12 September 2003, when the Sheffield Steelers, who went on to become the inaugural league champions, defeated the newly formed London Racers 6–1 at Alexandra Palace. Charles, Prince of Wales dropped the first puck, after unveiling a plaque. The Racers endured a difficult first season, moving to a different rink only weeks into the season and having to wait 40 games to record a win, a 3–0 victory over the Cardiff Devils. The Racers finished the season with 10 points, 38 points behind second-to-last Basingstoke. The other new team, the Manchester Phoenix, fared slightly better, qualifying for the playoff finals after finishing sixth in the league, where they were defeated 6–1 by Nottingham in the semifinal. The club played at the 17,500 capacity MEN Arena which had been home to the Manchester Storm, but Phoenix crowds averaged 2,250, well below the break-even mark of 3,000. Late in the season, the Phoenix choose to play a game at IceSheffield rather than pay the considerable cost of hiring the arena for a mid-week game (which usually had lower attendances). In the close season they allowed fans to vote on the option of either suspending playing operations while a new rink was constructed or playing in exile away from Manchester while a new rink was built. Supporters opted to suspend playing operations pending the construction of a new facility.

The second season of the EIHL saw a series of games between the EIHL clubs and the members of the BNL. In addition to three home games and three away games against their Elite opponents, each club also played one home game and one away game against the BNL clubs in crossover match-ups. Results in these crossover games counted towards a team's points tally. The NHL lock-out also saw a number of NHL players join British clubs. Coventry won all three titles, winning the championship with an overtime victory over the Nottingham Panthers.

The crossover games with the BNL clubs were seen by many to be the first stage towards an amalgamation of the two organizations into one league; essentially reforming the original BHL. However, early in the season it was revealed that two teams from the BNL, the Edinburgh Capitals and Newcastle Vipers, were seeking to resign from the BNL and join the EIHL; preferring the standard of hockey that the EIHL had to offer. A withdrawal of these clubs would leave the BNL with only five remaining participating teams. This situation led to the resigning teams temporarily withdrawing their Elite League applications and entering into collective discussions on the entire BNL joining the EIHL instead. The Elite League offered the BNL clubs invitations to join the EIHL structure, which were declined by the remaining teams due to unfavourable terms. Subsequently, the Capitals and Vipers both resubmitted individual applications to the Elite League; both of which were accepted. This ultimately led to the dissolution of the BNL, with the five remaining teams joining the next tier of British hockey (which consisted of the English Premier Ice Hockey League in England and the Scottish National League in Scotland). 

With the Edinburgh Capitals and Newcastle Vipers becoming the ninth and tenth members of the league, the 2005–06 season began with nine clubs (Manchester had opted to take another season out with no rink yet constructed). However, in November 2005, the London Racers withdrew their team from competition and immediately ceased operations. From their formation the Racers had suffered problems finding a rink with comparable facilities to those of their rivals and they had maintained only a very small fan base. The club had made the Lee Valley Ice Centre their home after playing only a small number of games at the Alexandra Palace in their first season. The facilities were very basic, seating only 900 people with an overall capacity of barely 1,000. In November 2005, during a game against the Nottingham Panthers; Panthers player Blaž Emeršič suffered a serious facial injury after colliding with a protruding object in the boards. Further concerns were raised when a game against the Sheffield Steelers was abandoned after a piece of plexiglas shattered in an irregular manner, injuring a spectator. When a similar event took place during practice a few days later; the Racers management began to question seriously the safety of the rink. With the Ice Centre unable to ensure the safety of players and spectators at Elite League games, the Racers were forced to suspend team operations effective immediately.

In January 2006, the Manchester Phoenix were granted planning permission to construct a new rink in Altrincham. A few weeks later, the Cardiff Devils also received planning permission for the construction of a new rink. The Wales National Ice Rink was earmarked for demolition and a campaign for the council to provide a new facility proved successful. With both clubs confirming their intent to take part the following season, speculation began about the possible inclusion of a tenth team to replace the London Racers. After the season was over, rumours about the possible admission of either Hull or Dundee became more and more widespread. On 22 June 2006, the Hull Stingrays were formally elected into the Elite Ice Hockey League as the tenth active member.

In June 2006, the EIHL announced the adoption of the "zero tolerance" interpretation of the rules with regard to holding, hooking and interference implemented in the National Hockey League during the 2005–06 season. These rules had proved highly successful in the NHL, increasing the pace of the game and leading to a rise in spectator numbers.

On 25 August 2006, the Elite League announced a sponsorship deal with the low cost airline bmibaby. The agreement saw the company's name incorporated into the league's title and the airline's branding at each of the league's ten arenas. The deal was intended to last for seven seasons, but ended prematurely during the 2008–09 season.

On 30 April 2009, the Manchester Phoenix announced that they would withdraw from the league, and play instead in the English Premier Ice Hockey League, due to cost issues. This news followed the announcement that the Basingstoke Bison were also leaving to play in the EPL for the 2009–10 season.

League expands and changes, 2010–2020

After losing two teams at the end of the 2008–09 season the Elite League was boosted by a new franchise joining the league. The Braehead Clan were announced as the ninth team for the 2010–11 season. On 27 April 2010, the Dundee Stars were unanimously accepted into the League by the EIHL board as the tenth team.

The Hull Stingrays withdrew from the League on 11 August 2010, announced via the club's official website, and later confirmed on the BBC's site. However, after a takeover from the Coventry Blaze on 17 August 2010, the Hull Stingrays confirmed that they would indeed be participating in the league for the 2010–11 season. The Stingrays again withdrew, on 24 June 2015, as the club announced on its official website that it has been placed into liquidation.

From the 2013–14 season onwards, the league has consisted of two conferences; each consisting of five teams. These are the Erhardt Conference and the Gardiner Conference. These can roughly be split into north and south, with the Erhardt featuring the teams from Belfast, Cardiff, Coventry, Nottingham, and Sheffield; and the Gardiner featuring the teams from Dundee, Edinburgh, Fife, and Glasgow along with Hull Stingrays until 2015, and their replacements Manchester Storm from 2015 onwards.

On 27 April 2017 it was announced that the Milton Keynes Lightning and Guildford Flames were joining for the start of the 2017–18 season and that the league schedule would be increased to 56 games in the regular season with three new conferences of four teams.

Conference 1 consisted of the Braehead Clan, Dundee Stars, Edinburgh Capitals and Fife Flyers known as the Scottish Conference.

Conference 2 consisted of the Coventry Blaze, Guildford Flames, Manchester Storm and Milton Keynes Lightning known as the Southern Conference.

Conference 3 consisted of the Belfast Giants, Cardiff Devils, Nottingham Panthers and Sheffield Steelers known as the Arena Teams. This meant that teams would play teams in their own conference eight times (four home and four away) totaling 24 games and play the other conference's teams four times (two home and two away) totaling 32 games, giving the league a total of 56 games.

In April 2018, when the Murrayfield Ice Rink asked for bidders for the ice time at the arena, the Edinburgh Capitals and Murrayfield Racers (a newly formed team) bid for the rights with the Racers winning the opportunity. The Racers asked for permission to join the EIHL, but on 30 April the league refused their application and they subsequently joined the Scottish National League (SNL).

On 4 May, the EIHL released a statement explaining that they would have to move forward without the Edinburgh Capitals with a board meeting on 22 May to discuss the league future format and decide on any clubs wishing to participate in place of Edinburgh.

After the conclusion of the 2018–19 season, the Milton Keynes Lightning officially left the EIHL after just two seasons in the league and moved to the newly created National Ice Hockey League (NIHL), returning the number of teams to 10. The three conference format was also scrapped.

Recent years, 2020–

The 2019–20 EIHL season was cancelled in March 2020 due to the COVID-19 pandemic. Only the Challenge Cup (won by Sheffield Steelers) was awarded with both the league and play-offs cancelled.

The 2020–21 EIHL season, originally scheduled for a September start, was suspended indefinitely on September 15, 2020, due to ongoing coronavirus restrictions and continuing social distancing which made the league season a non-starter.

While there were tentative plans for a shortened league season, featuring a handful of sides to potentially begin play in January 2021, this idea - and the prospect of a 2020–21 season - were shelved by the league in February 2021 due to concerns around funding.

Then, in March 2021, the Elite League announced that four of the English teams (Coventry, Manchester, Nottingham and Sheffield) would take part in the 'Elite Series' between April–May 2021, a total of 24 games to be played at Nottingham's Motorpoint Arena, culminating in a best-of-three play-off final series. Nottingham claimed the trophy by virtue of a 2–0 series win over the Sheffield Steelers in the final, winning game one 5-3 and game two 5–2.

In the 2021–22 EIHL season, the first full season to be completed since 2018–19 due to the impacts of the Covid pandemic, the Belfast Giants won both the Elite League title and the Challenge Cup, while the Cardiff Devils won the play-offs.

In May 2022, all ten Elite League clubs agreed to increase the gameday roster size from 19 to 20 - to take effect from the 2022–23 season. Import numbers in a gameday squad were once again capped at 14.

Structure

Several competitions fall under the jurisdiction of the Elite League.

The league consisted of three conferences, the results of which were compiled in one league table, up until the end of the 2018–19 season:
 Gardiner Conference: Dundee Stars, Fife Flyers, and Glasgow Clan
 Patton Conference: Coventry Blaze, Guildford Flames, and Manchester Storm.
 Erhardt Conference: Belfast Giants, Cardiff Devils, Nottingham Panthers, and Sheffield Steelers.,

Teams played each other six times (three home, three away), making for a 60-game regular season, but after the departure of Milton Keynes Lightning in 2019, the conference system was scrapped for the first time since 2011–12. Each team now plays 54 games.

Two points are awarded for a win and one for an overtime or penalty shootout defeat. Overtime consists of five minutes of three-on-three hockey and ends immediately if a goal is scored. The team that has most points at the end of the regular season is declared champion. Each team receives a regular season participation trophy.

The playoffs are contested by the teams with the best regular season records.  The winner is crowned the champion of the British Championship. The number of teams competing in the playoffs has varied. However, since the 2006–07 season, the top eight teams of the regular season have qualified for the quarter-finals, with their league position determining their seeding. All quarter-finals are two-legged ties. Both the semi-finals and the final take place over a single weekend in April at the National Ice Centre in Nottingham.

The Challenge Cup has taken a number of different formats, ranging from a table formed from the results of designated league fixtures to groups of four teams playing on a round-robin basis at the beginning of the season. During some seasons, Elite League games have also been classed as Challenge Cup games and points counted for both. The semi-finals and final are two-legged games, the winner being the team with the highest aggregate score at the end of the second game. All quarter- and semi-finalists receive a playoff participation trophy.

Clubs

Potential future clubs
The Aberdeen Lynx (currently competing in the Scottish National League) have stated that their ambition is to establish an Elite League team in the city in the future.

The Nottingham Panthers and Glasgow Clan owner Neil Black is rumoured to be setting up a new EIHL franchise in London, playing at Wembley Arena. Black has also stated in the past that he would like to see franchises in Manchester (which has now been achieved) and Dublin.

Wayne Scholes, owner of the Telford Tigers (currently in the English Premier League), has stated that his organisation does not have any immediate plans to make the step up, but has not ruled out the possibility of joining the EIHL in the future, saying that "We have had conversations with the Elite League before but they have to invite you. You can't approach them. It is one of those things where they want to see that you have got two or three years of really good solid success. They want to see that it is sustainable and that you are up to a certain standard, and then they will reach out. At that point, it's a discussion that we will have but right now we are pretty happy where we are."

EIHL Champions by season

The following table sets out the League champions, National champions and Challenge Cup winners of the EIHL era only. Several previous top-tier leagues, such as the Sekonda Super League have also existed, in which some EIHL clubs competed successfully, and the end-of-season play-offs and Challenge Cup both have a long history prior to the founding of the EIHL, again feature many of the teams currently in EIHL.

Only two teams have won a domestic treble; in the EIHL era Nottingham Panthers in 2012-13 and Coventry Blaze in 2004-05. By contrast, teams have come within one match of a treble on no less than 13 occasions, beginning with the very first season when Panthers denied Sheffield Steelers by the odd goal in seven in the Challenge Cup final, and including the last four completed seasons where Belfast Giants twice and Cardiff Devils twice, have been denied a 'Grand Slam' by losing in either the Challenge Cup or play-off final. In 2023 Fife Flyers became the first Scottish team in the EIHL era to reach a major final, losing 9-3 to Belfast Giants in the Challenge Cup.

Most trophies

Players
Elite League teams rely heavily on players from outside the United Kingdom (termed imports). The majority of these players are from North America, and typically played in the minor North American leagues such as the ECHL and AHL before coming to Britain. For example, of the 21 players to play for champions Belfast Giants in the 2005–06 season, 10 were Canadian, 8 were British and 3 were American. The league restricts the number of import players which can be dressed for a game, with a current limit of 14 imports. Player turnover is high, with a large proportion of players spending a single season at a team before moving on, and multi-year contracts are uncommon.

As would be expected in a league dominated by North American players, the style of ice hockey in Britain is similar to that played in North America, and has a more physical style than that played in other, technically natured European countries. This was demonstrated during the 2004–05 NHL lock-out. Of the NHL players to join Elite League teams, the majority were players noted for physical play rather than puck-handling skills; such as Wade Belak and Eric Cairns.

While British players account for a minority of Elite League players, the league supplies the majority of players for the Great Britain team. All 22 players in the Great Britain squad for the 2018 World Championships played for Elite League teams in the preceding season.

Media coverage

Television broadcast deals
In the 1980s and 1990s, Sky Sports and the BBC's Grandstand programme covered the British Hockey League and Superleague and their important games and competitions regularly.

However, in 2001 the Superleague sold its broadcasting rights to Premium TV Ltd who planned to set up a new sports channel, which never materialised. British ice hockey was left without coverage from any television network. This situation continued through the final seasons of the Superleague and into the first seasons of the Elite League.

In 2005, Elite League officials concluded an agreement with the North American Sports Network to provide a weekly highlights and news programme. These usually provide highlights from a game recorded the previous weekend and are an hour in length.

In September 2007, the Elite League announced a deal with Sky Sports for a weekly show of Elite League highlights.

In 2010, Sky Sports showed the playoff final between the Belfast Giants and Cardiff Devils live, the first time Sky had shown a live game for several years. Sky Sports have recently announced plans to show live games along with a weekly highlight show during the 2010–11 season.

In the 2013–14 season, Premier Sports acquired the rights to film and broadcast 23 games from the Elite League with a live game shown every Saturday night from 23 November onwards.

On 6 December 2016, it was announced that a new TV show called Facing Off would be broadcast on a UK free-to-air channel called "Front Runner TV" every Thursday, Friday and Saturday to show the highlights of the week's EIHL games. The deal ran to the end of 2016–17 EIHL season.

Then, on 20 July 2018, the EIHL agreed a two-year deal with FreeSports to broadcast one live EIHL game every two weeks, alongside a pre-season preview show, highlights package, and live coverage of the end of season play-off final. The coverage, which is available via Freeview, Sky, Virgin, FreeSat, TalkTalk, BT Vision and online via the TVPlayer, will be fronted by Aaron Murphy who previously commentated on the league for Premier Sports.

In January 2020, the league announced that Premier Sports would show live coverage of the 2020 Challenge Cup final and 2020 Elite League play-off final.

In September 2021, the league confirmed that Premier Sports had become headline sponsors and the EIHL's exclusive television partners for three seasons, beginning from the 2021–22 season. Coverage would again be fronted by Aaron Murphy, with analysis from Paul Adey, and consist of 27 live matches - including 23 league games, the Challenge Cup final and the end of season play-off final weekend. During this time, the league was known as the Premier Sports Elite League. In November 2022, following news Viaplay had acquired Premier Sports, the Elite League's title sponsors changed to the Viaplay Elite League to reflect the rebrand.

Other coverage
Ice hockey receives little national media coverage in the United Kingdom. Some national newspapers list results and provide short summaries of the league's news but more extensive coverage remains minimal. There was a small surge in interest during the 2004–05 season when newspapers such as The Times reported on the NHL players playing the Elite League as a result of the lock-out but since the lock-out ended, coverage has returned to its previous levels.

Of the national newspapers only the Daily Star has a regular ice hockey column, which appears on Tuesday and Sunday.

Coverage in the towns and cities where Elite League clubs are based is more extensive, and local newspapers have dedicated ice hockey reporters who cover the local team. Local radio stations such as BBC Coventry & Warwickshire, BBC Radio Nottingham and BBC Radio Sheffield all provide programming on the sport. Radio Sheffield also provides a weekly ice hockey programme Iceline while Radio Nottingham has broadcast a similar programme, Powerplay, since the later stages of the 2005–06 season, and has a 15-minute weekly preview of games on Saturday evenings during the ice hockey season after the station's coverage of the local football teams is completed. BBC Coventry & Warwickshire have also followed suit with Faceoff, a programme broadcast on the first Thursday of the month during the season.

The Cardiff Devils are given weekly highlights coverage on local TV station, "Made in Cardiff", which is available on Freeview Ch23, Sky Guide Ch134 and Virgin Ch159.

Most of the teams also provide webcasts on match nights.

Comparison to other leagues

In attendance, the EIHL ranks seventh among the European top leagues with a 2,842 average. Three teams are among the top 100 of the continent, 2016 Challenge Cup champions Nottingham Panthers at 38th (5,720 average), the 2016 league champions Sheffield Steelers at 64th (4,830) and the 2012 league champions Belfast Giants at 70th (4,603)

Previously, the EIHL champions were invited to play in the Continental Cup, Europe's second-level club competition. For the 2009–10 tournament, the EIHL's entrants began the tournament in the penultimate (third) group stage. However, with the introduction of the Champions Hockey League, this has changed. From the 2015–16 season, the top two teams in the EIHL participate in the CHL, with either the team that wins the post-season playoffs, or the team finishing third if the playoffs winner is one of the top two, entering the Continental Cup.

During the 2012–13 NHL Lockout, several NHL players plied their trade in the Elite League, including; Matt Beleskey, Paul Bissonnette, Drew Miller, Tom Sestito and Anthony Stewart.

The league has had a reputation for attracting ex-NHL players, including Dustin Kohn who played for the Sheffield Steelers, Kevin Westgarth who played for the Belfast Giants, Cam Janssen, formerly of the Nottingham Panthers, ex-Braehead Clan captain Matt Keith and Stefan Della Rovere, Ryan O'Marra of the Coventry Blaze, and Brian McGrattan who played for the Nottingham Panthers.

Elsewhere Jared Staal – brother of NHLers Eric, Marc and Jordan – played a season for the Edinburgh Capitals while Patrick Bordeleau played a season with the Cardiff Devils.

Other recent ex-NHL players in the league include Jason Williams, Ric Jackman, Jay Rosehill, Jim Vandermeer, Pavel Vorobyev, Michael Garnett, Tyson Strachan, Tim Wallace, Aaron Johnson, Dylan Olsen, Patrick Dwyer, and Chris Stewart.

Meanwhile, in being drafted by the Arizona Coyotes in 2018, Sheffield Steelers forward Liam Kirk became the first English born and trained player to be drafted by an NHL side. Kirk signed a three-year, entry-level contract with Arizona in June 2021.

Criticism of the EIHL
The main criticism levelled at the EIHL is that the league is too expensive, an accusation given credence by the collapse of the London Racers mid-season in 2005, and the continued financial problems experienced by a number of other member clubs (most notably the Basingstoke Bison and Manchester Phoenix in 2008–09).

Both the Edinburgh Capitals and Newcastle Vipers made public statements about their potentially perilous financial situations, casting further doubt over both their own, and the league's sustained viability.

This perceived problem with expenditure was given further credence when the Hull Stingrays announced, on 11 August 2010, that they were ceasing operations immediately, due to insufficient funds from sponsorships to guarantee completing the season. They were, however, taken over on 17 August 2010 by the Coventry Blaze and therefore the Hull Stingrays continued to operate. However, Hull did fold in 2015.

In 2011, the Newcastle Vipers announced that they would not be able to compete in the 2011–12 season due to financial difficulties and lack of a permanent home stadium. Newcastle had, up to this point, been playing their home games at Whitley Bay ice rink. A proposed new stadium in the Newcastle area did not materialise.

Expansion
Despite there being a limited number of suitable venues for league expansion, there have been various attempts during the EIHL's lifespan to expand the league. After the successful addition of the Braehead Clan and the Dundee Stars for the 2010–11 season, the EIHL reported that it had entered discussions with the Fife Flyers formerly of the defunct BNL, and then resident in the SNL.

On 24 June 2011, it was confirmed that the Fife Flyers had been admitted to the EIHL in time for the commencement of the 2011–12 season.

Further to this, Neil Black, owner of the Nottingham Panthers and Glasgow Clan has expressed the desire to see a Manchester team back in the EIHL by 2015, along with teams in Dublin and London, subject to there being suitable venues available.

In mid-2013, stories began to circulate that the EIHL had approached AEG with the intention of placing a London-based franchise into Wembley Arena. League chairman Tony Smith confirmed that a franchise had been awarded to a London-based group for a franchise located within the capital.

On 29 March 2016, it was announced that the Milton Keynes Lightning (playing in the second-tier English Premier League) would be joining the Elite League for the 2017–18 season. They remained in the league for two seasons.

On 24 February 2017, it was announced that the Guildford Flames would make the step-up to the Elite League for the following season, thus expanding the league to twelve teams.

Records
 Most regular season titles: Belfast Giants, Sheffield Steelers (5 each)
 Most play-off championship titles: Nottingham Panthers, Sheffield Steelers (5 each)
 Most Challenge Cup titles (EIHL era): Nottingham Panthers (8)
 Most Knockout Cup titles: Belfast Giants, Cardiff Devils, Coventry Blaze, Sheffield Steelers (1)
 Most wins in regular season: Belfast Giants (46) (2011–12, 54-game season)
 Most ties in regular season: London Racers (9) (2004–05, 50-game season)
 Most losses in regular season (inc. Overtime): London Racers (51) (2003–04, 56-game season)
 Most goals scored in regular season: Cardiff Devils (269) (2010–11, 54-game season)
 Most goals allowed in regular season: Edinburgh Capitals (418) (2010–11, 54-game season)
 Most points in regular season: Belfast Giants (95) (2011–12, 54-game season)
 Most shutouts in regular season: Ervins Mustukovs (Sheffield Steelers) 10 (2010–11)
 Highest attendance in regular season: 9,203 (Sheffield Steelers vs. Nottingham Panthers, 19 March 2016)
 Most goals in a single game (team) (regular season): Sheffield Steelers (18) (Sheffield Steelers 18–1 Edinburgh Capitals, 15 January 2011)
 Largest winning margin (regular season): Sheffield Steelers (17) (Sheffield Steelers 18–1 Edinburgh Capitals, 15 January 2011)

See also
 Man of Ice
 British ice hockey league champions
 List of professional sports teams in the United Kingdom

Notes

References

External links
 Elite Ice Hockey League

 
Top tier ice hockey leagues in Europe
Sports leagues established in 2003
2003 establishments in the United Kingdom
Multi-national ice hockey leagues in Europe
Professional ice hockey leagues in the United Kingdom